SA2 may refer to:

 SA-2 Guideline, the NATO reporting name of the S-75 Dvina, a Soviet SAM system
 Sonic Adventure 2, a Dreamcast/GameCube game
 Sonic Advance 2, a Game Boy Advance game

See also

 
 
 SAA2
 SAA (disambiguation)
 Sasa (disambiguation)
 SA (disambiguation)